Odorrana bolavensis is a species of frog in the family Ranidae. It is endemic to the Bolaven Plateau, Laos. Its natural habitats are wet evergreen forest. It can be found at night on rocks and vegetation along rocky streams, occasionally on leaf-litter or tree branches away from streams.

References

bolavensis
Amphibians described in 2005
Frogs of Asia
Amphibians of Laos
Endemic fauna of Laos
Taxonomy articles created by Polbot